During the 1992–93 season, Newcastle United participated in the Football League Division One.

Newcastle secured promotion to the top flight by winning the First Division Championship, often simply overwhelming opponents along the way (a 7–1 victory over Leicester City being particularly memorable). The Magpies joined the elite  FA Premier League for the 1993–94 season.

Season summary
After narrowly avoiding relegation from the old Second Division (renamed the First Division) the previous season, Kevin Keegan's Newcastle swept away all others before them, nearly breaking the English record for consecutive wins along the way before a 1–0 defeat at home to Grimsby Town broke the sequence.

The Newcastle team was spearheaded by the prolific striker Andy Cole and David Kelly, who were ably supported by midfielders Paul Bracewell, Gavin Peacock, Rob Lee, and Brian 'Killer' Kilcline (a tough free transfer defender who Keegan later claimed was his best signing).

Coincidentally it was the return game at Grimsby that saw Newcastle clinch promotion and the league title with a 2–0 win on an emotional night for the club's supporters, who invaded the pitch at the final whistle to congratulate their 'King Kev' and the players for returning the club to the top flight after a four-year exile. Late in the season, Keegan had signed young striker Andy Cole from Bristol City, who repaid his transfer fee by scoring 12 goals in the final 11 games of the season. In anticipation of a campaign in the new Premier League, Keegan re-signed a 1980s Newcastle hero, his former Newcastle strike partner Peter Beardsley from Everton in the close season.

Image gallery

Appearances, goals and cards
(Substitute appearances in brackets)

Coaching staff

Transfers

In

 Total spending:  £4.75m

Out

 Total income:  £745k

Loans out

Competitions

Pre-season

League

FA Cup

League Cup

Anglo-Italian Cup

Matches

Pre-season

Division 1

FA Cup

League Cup

Anglo-Italian Cup

External links
Newcastle United Football Club - Fixtures 1992-93
Transfers (Keegan) - Senior / Reserve Arrivals & Departures
The Great career - Profile
Season Details - 1992-93 - toon1892

Newcastle United F.C. seasons
Newcastle United